Norman Crawford Hallett (5 March 1894 – 30 April 1961) was an  Australian rules footballer who played with St Kilda in the Victorian Football League (VFL).

Notes

External links 

1894 births
1961 deaths
Australian rules footballers from Melbourne
St Kilda Football Club players
People from Elsternwick, Victoria